The Treaty of Peace and Friendship between Japan and the People's Republic of China (Japanese: , Chinese: 中华人民共和国和日本国和平友好条约, pinyin: Zhōnghuá Rénmín Gònghéguó hé Rìběnguó hépíng yǒuhǎo tiáoyuē) is a peace treaty concluded between the People's Republic of China and Japan on August 12, 1978. The treaty was signed in Beijing by Huang Hua (1913 – 2010), Foreign Minister of the People's Republic of China, and Sunao Sonoda (1913 – 1984), Minister for Foreign Affairs of Japan. The treaty went into effect on October 23, 1978 with the state visit of Vice Premier of the PRC Deng Xiaoping (1904 – 1997) to Japan.  The treaty had its origin in the Joint Communiqué of the Government of Japan and the Government of the People's Republic of China of 1972. Negotiations on a formal peace treaty began in 1974, but were drawn out over various disputes until 1978. The treaty ultimately consisted of five articles, and was strongly opposed by the Soviet Union.

See also 

 Joint Communiqué of the Government of Japan and the Government of the People's Republic of China
 China–Japan relations
 Japan China Trade Agreement 1974

Footnotes
A.*The treaty is commonly known in Japanese by its abbreviated name, .

Notes

References
 Cheng J.Y.S (2001).  China’s Japan Policy in the 1980s.  International Affairs, 61(1), 91-107. 
 Tow W.T. (1983).  Sino-Japanese Security Cooperation: Evolution and Prospects.   Pacific Affairs, 56(1), 51-84.

China–Japan treaties
Treaties of the People's Republic of China
1978 in Japan
Treaties concluded in 1978